Kjell Johansson may refer to:

Kjell Johansson (referee) (active 1978-1982), Swedish football referee
Kjell Johansson (table tennis) (1946–2011), Swedish table tennis player
Kjell Johansson (tennis) (born 1951), Swedish tennis player